Ligelizumab (INN; development code QGE031) is a humanized IgG1 monoclonal antibody designed for the treatment of severe asthma and chronic spontaneous urticaria. It is an anti-IgE that binds to IGHE an acts as an immunomodulator.

This drug was developed by Novartis Pharma AG. Research funded by Novartis Pharma concluded that Ligelizumab was more effective in treating chronic spontaneous urticaria than omalizumab or placebo.

References

Monoclonal antibodies